The Kremasta Dam is an earth-fill embankment dam on the Achelous River in Aetolia-Acarnania, Greece. It is located just downstream of where the Agrafiotis, Tavropos and Trikeriotis rivers meet to form the Achelous. The dam was constructed between 1961 and 1965 and its four 109.3 MW Francis turbine-generators were commissioned between 1966 and 1967. Shortly after the dam's reservoir, Lake Kremasta, was filled a 6.3-Mw earthquake occurred. This has been attributed to reservoir-induced seismicity. Lake Kremasta is the largest artificial lake in Greece.

See also

 Energy in Greece
 Renewable energy in Greece

References

Dams in Greece
Hydroelectric power stations in Greece
Earth-filled dams
Dams completed in 1965
Dams on the Achelous River
Buildings and structures in Aetolia-Acarnania
1967 establishments in Greece
Energy infrastructure completed in 1967